Max Schirschin (29 January 1921 – 16 May 2013) was a German football player and manager.

He played for Schalke 04, Angers, Le Havre, Rouen and RC Maison-Carrée.

He coached Rouen, Gent, Fortuna '54, Metz and Le Havre. and Bastia.

References

External links 
 

1921 births
2013 deaths
German footballers
German football managers
Angers SCO players
Le Havre AC players
FC Rouen players
Ligue 1 players
Ligue 2 players
FC Rouen managers
K.A.A. Gent managers
Fortuna Sittard managers
FC Metz managers
Le Havre AC managers
Expatriate football managers in Belgium
German expatriate sportspeople in Belgium
Expatriate football managers in France
German expatriate sportspeople in France
People from the Province of Upper Silesia
People from Racibórz County
Sportspeople from Silesian Voivodeship
Association football defenders